Pseuderemias brenneri, also known commonly as Brenner's racerunner or  Brenner's sand racer, is a species of lizard in the family Lacertidae. The species is native to the Horn of Africa.

Etymology
The specific name, brenneri, is in honor of Richard Brenner, who was a German explorer of Africa.

Geographic range
P. brenneri is found in Djibouti, eastern Ethiopia, Somalia, and northeastern Sudan.

Habitat

Description

Reproduction
P. brenneri is oviparous.

References

Further reading
Lanza B (1983). "A List of the Somali Amphibians and Reptiles". Monitore Zoologico Italiano. Supplemento 18 (1): 193–247. (Pseuderemias brenneri, new combination). (in English, with an abstract in Italian).
Largen MJ, Spawls S (2010). Amphibians and Reptiles of Ethiopia and Eritrea. Frankfurt am Main: Edition Chimaira / Serpents Tale. 694 pp. . (Pseuderemias brenneri, p. 365).
Peters W (1869). "Über neue Gattungen und neue oder weniger bekannte Arten von Amphibien (Eremias, Dicrodon, Euprepes, Lygosoma, Typhlops, Eryx, Rhychonyx, Elapomorphus, Achalinus, Coronella, Dromicus, Xenopholis, Anoplodipsas, Spilotes, Tropidonotus)". Monatsberichte der Königlich Preussischen Akademie der Wissenschaften zu Berlin 1869: 432–447. (Eremias brenneri, new species, pp. 432–433). (in German).

Pseuderemias
Lacertid lizards of Africa
Fauna of Djibouti
Reptiles of Ethiopia
Reptiles of Somalia
Vertebrates of Sudan
Reptiles described in 1869
Taxa named by Wilhelm Peters